Francisco de Paula Bastos or Viscount Bastos (11 June 1793 –2 September 1881) was a Portuguese noble, military and political figure.

Biography
Bastos was the 76th colonial governor of Cape Verde between 1842 and 1845.  He was received a title by king Louis I of Portugal under a decree of May 18, 1863.  He was one of the figures who fought for the protection of Portugal's independence and freedom.

He fought in the Peninsular War and was decorated and was injured in Nivelle, he was one of the most bravest cooperators of a great work by the Duke of Bragança.

He emigrated to Plymouth through Galicia and later moved to Terceira Island in the Azores where he arrived on 7 March 1828.

He was a soldier of liberty, under the orders of Count of Vila Flor, took part in the contest of the Portuguese Civil War  on 11 August 1829.  His uniform of the general was decorated with medals that proved his bravery for the freedom and independence.  He died in Angra do Heroísmo in Terceira Island on 2 September 1881, then the main city of the Azores.

See also
List of colonial governors of Cape Verde

Notes

1793 births
1881 deaths
Colonial heads of Cape Verde
Portuguese colonial governors and administrators
Portuguese generals
Viscounts of Portugal